David Nolan may refer to:

 David Nolan (politician) (1943–2010), co-founder of the United States Libertarian Party
 David Nolan (American author) (born 1946), American author
 David Nolan (British author), British author of I Swear I Was There: The Gig That Changed The World
 David Nolan (footballer) (born 1968), English former footballer
 David Nolan (rugby union), rugby union player
 David Nolan (Once Upon a Time), a fictional character from the television series Once Upon a Time
 David Nolan (swimmer), American swimmer